The 2008–09 Segunda División season (known from that season as Liga Adelante for sponsorship reasons) was the 78th since its establishment. The first matches of the season were played on 30 August 2008, and the season ended on 21 June 2009. Real Zaragoza, Real Murcia and Levante were the teams relegated from La Liga the previous season. Alicante, Girona, Huesca and Rayo Vallecano were the teams promoted from Segunda División B the previous season.

The first goal of the season was scored by Alexandre Geijo, who scored in the 11th minute for Levante against Real Zaragoza in the early kick-off. The first red card of the season was given to Paco Peña from Real Murcia after a challenge on Sergio Pachón in their opening match against Rayo Vallecano. The first hat-trick was scored by Sebastián Abreu in the match between Xerez and Real Sociedad.

Teams 

 

The 2008–09 Segunda División was made up of the following teams:

League table

Results

Pichichi Trophy for Top Goalscorers
Last updated 21 June 2009

Zamora Trophy for Top Goalkeepers
Last updated 21 June 2009

Season statistics

Scoring
First goal of the season: Alexandre Geijo for Levante against Real Zaragoza (30 August 2008)
Fastest goal in a match: 14 seconds – Sergio Rodríguez for Real Sociedad against Alavés (27 September 2008)
Goal scored at the latest point in a match: 90+8 minutes – Alexandre Geijo for Levante UD against Albacete Balompié (6 December 2008)
Widest winning margin: 8 – Hércules 8–0 Sevilla Atlético (5 April 2009)
Most goals in a match: 8 
Xerez 5–3 Real Murcia (2 November 2008)
Hércules 8–0 Sevilla Atlético (5 April 2009)
First hat-trick of the season: Sebastián Abreu for Real Sociedad against Xerez (14 March 2009)
First own goal of the season: Ricardo Cavas for Xerez against Valicante (30 August 2008)
Most goals by one player in a single match: 3
Sebastián Abreu for Real Sociedad against Xerez (14 March 2009)
Rubén Navarro for Hércules against Sevilla Atlético (5 April 2009)
Leonardo Ulloa for Castellón against Eibar (14 June 2009)
Most goals by one team in a match: 8 – Hércules 8–0 Sevilla Atlético (5 April 2009)
Most goals in one half by one team: 5 – Xerez 5–3 Real Murcia (2 November 2008)
Most goals scored by losing team: 3  
Xerez 5–3 Real Murcia (2 November 2008)
Córdoba 3–4 Celta Vigo (8 November 2008)

Cards
First yellow card: Lillo for Real Murcia against Rayo Vallecano (30 August 2008)
First red card: Paco Peña for Real Murcia against Rayo Vallecano (30 August 2008).

Teams by autonomous community 

2008-09
2
Spain